Øistein Hermansen (25 July 1919 – 29 March 1992) was a Norwegian politician for the Communist Party.

He served as a deputy representative to the Parliament of Norway from Hedmark during the terms 1954–1957 and 1958–1961. In total he met during 46 days of parliamentary session.

References

1919 births
1992 deaths
People from Åmot
Deputy members of the Storting
Communist Party of Norway politicians
Hedmark politicians